David Ives (born July 11, 1950) is an American playwright, screenwriter, and novelist. He is perhaps best known for his comic one-act plays; The New York Times in 1997 referred to him as the "maestro of the short form". Ives has also written dramatic plays, narrative stories, and screenplays, has adapted French 17th and 18th-century classical comedies, and adapted 33 musicals for New York City's Encores! series.

Early life and education
Ives wrote his first play when he was nine. He attended a boys Catholic seminary.  "We would-be priests were groomed for gravitas," he has said. At the end of the year the seniors could be a part of a school show called "The Senior Mock," in which the students satirized the teachers. Ives played the role of "the chain-smoking English teacher who coached the track team (while smoking)", and he wrote and performed a song. This school experience, along with seeing a production of Edward Albee’s A Delicate Balance, starring Hume Cronyn and Jessica Tandy, were two early events that inspired his interest in theatre.

Ives attended Northwestern University, majoring in English. He graduated with a Bachelor of Arts degree in 1971. He traveled to Germany, where he taught English. Ives graduated from the Yale School of Drama with a Master of Fine Arts in 1984.

Theater

His play, Canvas, was produced in California in 1972, and then at Circle Repertory Company in New York City. In New York Ives worked as an editor for William P. Bundy, the editor at Foreign Affairs magazine.  Ives wrote three full-length plays: St. Freud (1975), The Lives and Deaths of the Great Harry Houdini, and City of God.  In 1983 Ives was playwright-in-residence at the Williamstown Theatre Festival in Massachusetts where The Lives and Deaths of the Great Harry Houdini was produced.

In 1987 his short play Words, Words, Words was presented at the Manhattan Punch Line Theatre, followed by Sure Thing, Variations on the Death of Trotsky, Philip Glass Buys a Loaf of Bread (1990), and The Universal Language. A two-act play, Ancient History was produced Off-Broadway in 1989 by Primary Stages.

Ives' All in the Timing, an evening of six one-act plays, premiered at Primary Stages in 1993, moved to the larger John Houseman Theatre, and ran for 606 performances. In a review The New York Times said "there is indeed a real heart ...  There is sustenance as well as pure entertainment." Critic Vincent Canby wrote, "Ives [is] wizardly ...  magical and funny ...  a master of language.  He uses words for their meanings, sounds and associations, spinning conceits of a sort I’ve not seen or heard before. He’s an original." It won the Outer Critics Circle John Gassner Award for Playwriting, was included in Best Plays of 1993 — 1994, and in 1995 — 1996 was the most performed play in the country after William Shakespeare’s plays.

Ives’ full-length play, Don Juan in Chicago, premiered off-Broadway in New York at Primary Stages, on March 25, 1995. The Red Address, a full-length drama, premiered in New York at Second Stage Theater in January 1997.<ref>"Theater Review; The Red Address". New York Daily News". 13 January 1997</ref>

An evening of one-act plays, Mere Mortals and Others, opened off-Broadway at Primary Stages in New York, May 13, 1997. Peter Marks of The New York Times described it as "a collection of six fast and ferociously funny comedies ...  a madcap evening of one-acts", and noted that Ives has the "gratifying ability to unharness the intoxicating power of language and at the same time entertain."Polish Joke, a full-length play, has been described as loosely autobiographical.  It premiered in the summer of 2001 at the Contemporary Theatre of Seattle, and then opened in New York at the Manhattan Theatre Club in February 2003, in the cast in New York was Walter Bobbie, who would later be the director of Venus in Fur.Jacobson, Lynn. "Review: Polish Joke." Variety.  27 July 2001The Blizzard is a short play that was written as part of a theatrical concept that began in 1995 on the lower East Side of Manhattan, in which a group of writers, actors and directors would gather together to create a play from scratch, rehearse it, and perform it — all within 24 hours.  The Blizzard, and eight of Ives' other short plays, was produced on the radio by Playing On Air, directed by John Rando and starred Jesse Eisenberg.Ives, David. The Blizzard. Tumbler

Primary Stages presented a revival of All in the Timing in January 2013. This new production was directed by John Rando.Ives, David. English Made Simple All in the Timing: Fourteen Plays (2010), Random House LLC, 

His plays have been published in the anthologies All in the Timing, Time Flies, and Polish Joke And Other Plays.

In the mid-1990s, Ives contributed pieces to Spy Magazine, The New York Times Magazine, and The New Yorker. New York magazine named him one of the "100 Smartest New Yorkers".  When asked by the magazine to comment on being so listed for the same issue, Ives’ response began, "Grocery lists. Spelling lists. Laundry lists.  The very idea of lists has something inherently narrow, petty, unpoetic about it.  "List, list, O list!" cried Hamlet’s father's ghost in exasperation, and I couldn't agree more..."

His translation of Georges Feydeau's farce A Flea in Her Ear was produced at Chicago Shakespeare in 2006, and won the Joseph Jefferson Award for "new adaptation". His play, Is He Dead? adapted from an "unproduced 1898 comedy" by Mark Twain, ran on Broadway from December 2007 to March 2008. New Jerusalem, concerning the excommunication of Baruch Spinoza, opened Off-Broadway in January 2008 (previews from December 2007) in a Classic Stage Company production. New Jerusalem won a Hull-Warriner Award.

In 2010, he adapted Pierre Corneille's comedy The Liar for The Shakespeare Theatre Company in Washington, D.C.Wren, Celia. "Playwright David Ives updates "The Liar" for the Shakespeare Theatre Company" The Washington Post, April 4, 2010 It won the Charles MacArthur Award for Outstanding New Play at the Helen Hayes Awards in Washington the following year. In 2011 his version of Molière’s The Misanthrope premiered Off-Broadway at Classic Stage Company under the title, The School For Lies. Also in 2011 his adaptation of Jean-Francois Regnard’s Le Legataire universel premiered at the Shakespeare Theatre Company in Washington, D.C. under the title, The Heir Apparent. The Heir Apparent opened Off-Broadway in March 2014 (previews) at the Classic Stage Company, and ran through May 2014.Sommer, Elyse."Review" curtainup.com, April 4, 2014Venus in Fur opened Off-Broadway at the Classic Stage Company in January 2010 with Nina Arianda and Wes Bentley.Healey, Patrick. "Run Extended for 'Venus in Fur'" The New York Times, February 3, 2010 Venus in Fur premiered on Broadway in October 2011 (previews) at the Samuel J. Friedman Theatre, produced by the Manhattan Theatre Club. Nina Arianda returned to the role she created Off-Broadway and Hugh Dancy played the role originated by Bentley. Walter Bobbie once again directed. The play transferred to the Lyceum Theatre in February 2012 for an extended run with Arianda and Dancy reprising their performances.All in the Timing was, after Shakespeare plays, the most produced play in the United States during the 1995–1996 season, and Venus in Fur was most produced, after Shakespeare plays,  during the 2013–2014 season.

His Lives of the Saints began in previews Off-Broadway at Primary Stages in February 2015, running through March 27, 2015. Directed by John Rando, Lives of the Saints consists of seven short plays. The plays are: Enigma Variations, The Mystery at Twicknam Vicarage, Babels in Arms, Soap Opera, Lives of the Saints, Arabian Nights, and Captive Audience. Several of the plays had been produced previously. The Lives of the Saints was produced with five of the plays at the Berkshire Theatre Festival, Stockbridge, Massachusetts in August and September 1999.

His play, The Liar, based on a 17th-century play by Pierre Corneille opened at the Classic Stage Company in New York January 26, 2017.

He has continued to base plays on 17th century French plays: in 2017, The School for Lies, based on Moliere's play The Misanthrope, opened at the Lansburgh Theatre in Washington, DC.

In April 2018, Red Bull Theater presented the New York premiere The Metromaniacs, his "transladaptation" of a rediscovered French farce by Alexis Piron at The Duke on 42nd Street directed by Michael Kahn.

Musical theatre
In the early 1990s Ives started working in musical theatre, writing the libretto for an opera based on Frances Hodgson Burnett's The Secret Garden (music by Greg Pliska). It premiered in Philadelphia in 1991 at the Pennsylvania Opera Theater.

He then became a regular adapter for the New York City Center Encores! series of American musicals in concert, starting with Out Of This World in 1995, Du Barry Was A Lady in 1996, and working on two or three a year until 2012. As of 2013, Ives ended his writing for Encores!, saying "I've very happily done 33 adaptations for Encores! But there comes a time when it's time for someone else to have that pleasure, especially given how full my platter is these days." His Encores! adaptation of Wonderful Town moved to Broadway's Al Hirschfeld Theatre in 2003, directed by Kathleen Marshall.

He adapted David Copperfield's magic show, Dreams and Nightmares, which premiered on Broadway at the Martin Beck Theatre in December 1996. He also adapted Cole Porter's Jubilee (1998) and Rodgers and Hammerstein's South Pacific (with Reba McEntire) for concert performances at Carnegie Hall, as well as My Fair Lady for a staged concert at Avery Fisher Hall in New York in 2007.

He helped to rework the book for the Broadway version of the musical Dance of the Vampires, with book, music and lyrics by Jim Steinman and original German book and lyrics by Michael Kunze. The musical opened on Broadway in October 2002 in previews, and closed in January 2003 after 56 performances. He co-wrote the book for Irving Berlin's White Christmas, which premiered in San Francisco in 2004 and then went on to tour across the United States. It had a limited engagement on Broadway from November 2008 to January 2009, and also from November 2009 to January 2010.

He was collaborating with Stephen Sondheim on a new untitled musical based on two of the films of Luis Buñuel. It was set to premiere in 2017. On April 27th 2021, Sondheim announced the show was no longer in development.

On September 15th, 2021 while appearing on The Late Show with Stephen Colbert, Stephen Sondheim announced that he was working on a new musical called Square One in collaboration with David Ives. The same day, Nathan Lane revealed that he and Bernadette Peters were involved in a reading of this new work.

Narrative fiction
Ives wrote The Phobia Clinic, a full-length narrative verse-novel published in 2010. It is described as a philosophical horror novel written in verse. It is, according to the author, "grotesque, satirical, personal, sometimes funny, but mostly reflecting the mood of the title." Inspired by Dante, The Phobia Clinic employs the verse form of the Divine Comedy, known as terza rima, with the lines grouped in threes, and each group, or tercet,  following the rhyme scheme ″aba, bcb, cdc, ded, ... ″ throughout Ives’ 55 cantos.Ives, David. The Phobia Clinic. The Coral Press. 2010.

Ives wrote a young adult book, Monsieur Eek, which was released in 2001. The book is set in 1609, and is a "fairy tale–like story full of absurd characters who make bizarre interpretations..." His next book was Scrib (2005), set in the American West in 1863."Book Reviews. 'Scrib'" kirkusreviews.com, February 15, 2005 His book Voss: How I Come to America and Am Hero, Mostly'', was released in 2008.

Personal
Ives lives in New York City with his wife, Martha Ives, a book illustrator, a linoprint artist and a member of the Society of American Graphic Artists.

References

External links

David Ives writer biography

20th-century American dramatists and playwrights
1950 births
Living people
Northwestern University alumni
Yale School of Drama alumni
Writers from Chicago
American people of Polish descent
21st-century American dramatists and playwrights